Constance Zimmer (born October 11, 1970) is an American actress. She rose to prominence playing Dana Gordon on the HBO series Entourage (2005–11) and Claire Simms on the ABC series Boston Legal (2006–07). She went on to appear on the Netflix series House of Cards (2013–18) and voiced Strongarm on Transformers: Robots in Disguise (2014–17). She gained wider recognition for her role as Quinn King on Unreal (2015–18), where she received a Critics' Choice Television Award and a Primetime Emmy Award nomination both in 2016.

Early life and education 
Zimmer was born in Seattle, Washington, to German migrant parents from the former East Prussia. She speaks fluent German, saying in a 2015 interview that although her parents spoke English with her as a child, she spent six weeks of every summer in Germany, with her grandmother who only spoke German. Zimmer decided to pursue a career in acting after she fell in love with the craft as a high school student. Following high school, she was accepted to the American Academy of Dramatic Arts in Pasadena.

Career 

Zimmer's stage career was highlighted with her award-winning portrayal in a Los Angeles production of Catholic School Girls, where she won a Dramalogue for Best Actress. After starring in several national commercials, most notably for Duracell, she started making guest appearances in such shows as Ellen, Seinfeld,  The X-Files, Gideon's Crossing, and The King of Queens, as well as having recurring roles in The Wayans Bros., Hyperion Bay, and The Trouble With Normal. During that same period, she was cast in a few independent movies such as Spin Cycle, Home Room,  and Warm Blooded Killers.

Zimmer eventually booked her first TV series regular role on the NBC comedy Good Morning, Miami as the lazy and burned-out office assistant, Penny Barrington. After the series was canceled, she spent the second season recurring as Sister Lilly Waters in the CBS drama, Joan of Arcadia, as well as guest-starring in episodes of NYPD Blue and Jake in Progress. Also in 2005, she acted in the short film Just Pray, directed by Tiffani Thiessen. It was accepted into the Tribeca Film Festival.

In early 2006, Zimmer was cast as Brianna, the competitive law undergrad, in the ABC crime/drama series In Justice. She joined the cast of Boston Legal, where she played associate attorney Claire Simms on the show's third season. Along with regulars Rene Auberjonois, Julie Bowen, and Mark Valley, Zimmer was dropped by David E. Kelley at the end of season three. Zimmer also portrayed industry powerhouse and studio executive Dana Gordon in the HBO original series Entourage from 2005 to 2011, arguably her most known role to date.

Zimmer performed in the world-premiere play, Girls Talk, alongside Brooke Shields, Andrea Bendewald, and Nicole Paggi. The play was written and directed by Roger Kumble. She also starred in the NBC summer series Love Bites as Colleen Rouscher and had a guest appearance on USA's Royal Pains, playing psychiatrist Dr. Abby Burton.

In 2014, she was cast in the series regular role of Quinn King on the Lifetime dramedy series UnREAL. The show has received critical acclaim and Zimmer's performance has garnered high praise. The series ended in July 2018 after four seasons. For her performance in the series, she won a Critics' Choice Television Award for Best Supporting Actress in a Drama Series and received a nomination for the Primetime Emmy Award for Outstanding Supporting Actress in a Drama Series.

In 2015, she had a recurring role on season three of the ABC superhero series Agents of S.H.I.E.L.D. as Rosalind Price. She has been a semi-regular panelist on ABC's Match Game since 2017.

Personal life 
Zimmer has been married twice. First, to special effects artist Steve Johnson, whom she met when working on Duracell commercials featuring The Puttermans in the late 1990s.

On January 5, 2008, Zimmer gave birth to a daughter, Colette Zoe, whose father is director Russ Lamoureux. On June 20, 2010, it was announced that Zimmer and Lamoureux were engaged. They married in October of that year.

Zimmer attends many celebrity benefits for charity. Among those she supports are the Make-A-Wish Foundation, Natural Resources Defense Council, and Heifer International.

Filmography

Film

Television

Awards and nominations

References

External links 

 

1970 births
Living people
20th-century American actresses
21st-century American actresses
Actresses from Seattle
American Academy of Dramatic Arts alumni
American film actresses
American people of German descent
American television actresses
American voice actresses
Newport Harbor High School alumni